Mauvette may refer to:
 a Hydrangea aspera variety
 Mauvette (character), a character associated with Demi the Demoness